Nevisport is an outdoor clothing and equipment retailer, specialising in climbing, skiing, camping and general outdoor gear. Nevisport stocks a large range of outdoor clothing and equipment from the industry's leading brands.

History 
Founded in 1970 by a pair of highland climbers and outdoor instructors Ian A Sykes MBE and Ian D Sutherland, Nevisport (a ‘wee climbing shop’) started life with money saved by Sykes (a former member of the RAF Mountain Rescue Team) while serving as a base commander in the Falkland Islands on the British Antarctic Survey.

The first Nevisport occupied a small store at the west end of Fort William's high street and was sustained financially during its first year by Sutherland, who continued to work full-time elsewhere while Sykes ran the shop day to day. Such was the success of the fledgling company it was soon forced to relocate to larger premises and subsequently opened a second store in Glasgow in 1974.

By the spring of 1982 Nevisport had moved its headquarters into a purpose built retail unit at the end of Fort William's high street which remains the focal point of the town centre to this day and is still the company's flagship store. Nevisport Fort William also incorporates a café and bar well used by walkers and climbers over the years as well as a gift shop catering for tourists. During the early 1990s the company moved into Edinburgh and also opened what is the UK's highest outdoor shop on the western slopes of Aonach Mor at the top of the gondola at the Nevis Range ski centre. From the front door of what is arguably Britain's only true ‘mountain’ shop, hardy visitors can ride one of the world's best downhill mountain bike tracks, or ski Nevis Range's fearsome Back Corries. Those looking for a slightly more sedate activity can also send a postcard from Britain's highest post box!

In 1997 Nevisport continued its expansion by acquiring an English outdoor chain called Wilderness Ways and an independent store by the name of Nick Estcourts. Shortly afterwards Clive Rowland's store in Aviemore and Marshall's in Aberdeen were welcomed on board too, making Nevisport one of the biggest outdoor companies in the northern half of the UK.

In 2004 Sykes and Sutherland retired, leaving Nevisport as an established name.

Acquisition 
In October 2007 Nevisport was acquired by Jacobs & Turner Ltd and Nevisport's headquarters and warehouse were relocated to Glasgow. The move provided the financial stability to expand further south into Manchester and also took Nevisport to the opposite end of the UK, opening a new store in Fraddon, Cornwall. In 2012 a new discount outlet outside Fleetwood, Lancashire, was opened taking today's store total to twelve.

Nevis Range ski development 
Nevisport also has very close links to Scotland's newest ski area at Nevis range. Nevisport co-founder Ian Sykes played a pivotal role in the development and construction of the resort, a project that was first imagined back in 1968. 1974 brought the project closer to reality with the publication of a planning report sponsored by the Scottish Tourist Board, but it wasn't until 1986 that the ski centre began serious development with construction beginning in 1988. One week before Christmas 1989, Sykes and his team officially opened Nevis Range to the public, and it was in part due to the enormous success of this project that Sykes received his MBE for ‘services to sport and mountain rescue’ in 1990.

The development garnered widespread admiration for the way its construction respected the landscape and environment, with no bulldozing involved in piste creation and all materials brought in by helicopter to protect the delicate local environment. Buildings were designed to blend with the vegetation and Nevis Range has been hailed as the model of a well-managed, low impact outdoors development.

Nevis Range is not only famed for offering some of Scotland's best skiing (including the infamous Back Corries), but it also boasts a fearsome, world-renowned downhill mountain bike track first built in 1994. A fixture of the UCI Downhill World Cup series for twelve of the last thirteen years it is also a regular venue for 4-Cross and X-Country world cup races and was the first destination worldwide to play host to all three disciplines.

Stores 
Nevisport currently has 13 stores around the United Kingdom. Fort William, Glasgow, Edinburgh, Aviemore, Aonach Mor (Nevis Range), Kendal, Fleetwood, Middlesbrough, Manchester, Bents Garden Centre (Warrington), Woking and Fraddon in Cornwall. Selected Nevisport stores also offer ski servicing facilities.

Current brands 
Among numerous other, Nevisport currently stock the following brands:
The North Face, Berghaus, Rab, Jack Wolfskin, Salomon, Montane, Haglofs, Scarpa, Sherpa Adventure Gear, Atomic, Rossignol, Black Diamond, DMM, Merrell, Animal, Trespass, Icebreaker, Mammut, Leki, Lowe Alpine, Terra Nova, Columbia, Head, Smartwool, Keen, MSR and Wild Country. Nevisport also supplies its own range of branded ski luggage, built to offer excellent protection and value for seasoned skiers’ gear.

Footnotes

External links 
 Official website

Retail companies of the United Kingdom
Retail companies established in 1970
Companies based in Glasgow
1970 establishments in Scotland